is a manga by Osamu Tezuka that began published weekly during 1966 to 1967.

Plot
Toppei Tachibana, a mysterious teenager, visited Mushi Production and persuaded its president, Osamu Tezuka to let him work at his studio. But later Tezuka discovered that Toppei is more than he sees: he is a vampire, which is a species that can transform from humans to a variety of animals, and he is a werewolf. Toppei came to Tokyo to search for his father, Professor Tachibana. After Toppei accidentally murdered Professor Atami, an old friend of Tezuka, Rokuro Makube, an evil teenager who is also the ward of Mika Onishi's family, blackmailed Tezuka to control Toppei to his advantages.

Meanwhile, Toppei's vampire community was planning a revolution against normal humans, and Rock sided with them to help him to manipulate the world. As chaos threatened the world, Toppei, Tezuka and Toppei's younger brother Chippei must work together to stop the vampires.

Characters
Toppei Tachibana: the protagonist of the manga. He is a vampire, and a typical werewolf. His transformations will be triggered when he is angry or hating someone (with the full moon). 
Osamu Tezuka: the president of Mushi Production and manga writer, he accepted Toppei as an employee of his production company. He discovered that Toppei is a vampire and helped him to stop the Vampires' revolution.
Chippei Tachibana: Toppei's younger brother, he transforms to werewolf when he sees round things. His nose has great olfaction which proves to be great use.
Rokuro Makube, a.k.a. Rock is the main antagonist of the manga series. He was the butler for Mika Onishi. It was revealed through the conversation between him and his best friend Saigo, that he was a village student before joining the rich Onishi family to steal their wealth, by kidnapping Mika (with Toppei's assistance as a werewolf) and made the Onishi's couples' will to give their inheritance to him before murdering them. Later he sided with the vampires so that their plan can help him to gain control over the world. He may be insane and charismatic and evil at some points, but he had a strong bond with his best and only friend: Saigo.

Series Cast
Yutaka Mizutani - Toppei Tachibana
Hiroshi Satō - Rokuro Makube aka Rock
Fumio Watanabe - Morimura
Yoshiaki Yamamoto - Chippei Tachibana
Osamu Tezuka - Himself

See also
List of Osamu Tezuka manga
Osamu Tezuka
Osamu Tezuka's Star System

References

External links

The Vampires (manga series) in TezukaOsamu.net.

Osamu Tezuka manga
Shogakukan manga
Shōnen manga
Vampires in anime and manga
Werewolf comics
Japanese television series with live action and animation